Scott Walker Sings Jacques Brel is a compilation of Jacques Brel compositions recorded by Scott Walker during the period of 1967 to 1969. The compilation brings together all the Brel material that Walker covered on record. Walker additionally performed five Brel songs on his television series including "Alone"; another Brel/Shuman composition.  None of these live recordings were released on the accompanying soundtrack.

"Mathilde", "My Death" and "Amsterdam" are from Scott (1967). "Jackie", "Next" and "The Girls and the Dogs" are from Scott 2 (1968). "Sons Of", "Funeral Tango" and "If You Go Away" are from Scott 3 (1969).

The original 1981 release included the Walker composition "Little Things (That Keep Us Together)" from 'Til the Band Comes In (1970) to round off the second side of the LP.

Rhapsody (online music service) praised the album, calling it one of their favorite cover albums.

Track listing

Original 1981 LP

1990 CD re-release

Release details

References

Scott Walker (singer) albums
1981 compilation albums
Cultural depictions of Jacques Brel